This article lists the Human Development Index (HDI) rating of the States and union territories of India. 

HDI is a composite index that takes into consideration health, education and income.

The national average HDI for India in 2008 was 0.467. By 2010, its average HDI had risen to 0.519. UNDP, the sponsor of the Human Development Index methodology since 1990, reported India's HDI to be 0.554 for 2012, an 18% increase over its 2008 HDI. The United Nations declared India's HDI to be 0.586 in 2014, a 5.77% increase over 2012. As for the year 2018, HDI for India stood at 0.647.

HDI (UNDP method) 

The following values are estimates from 2021 calculated by Global Data Lab, using the same method of calculation as UNDP.

HDI (NSC method) 
The following values are estimates from 2017-2018 calculated by the National Statistical Commission (NSC) of India. These values were calculated based on a modified version of the UNDP method of calculation, using per-capita Gross State Domestic Product (GSDP) in the national currency to measure the "decent standard of living" component of HDI, rather than per-capita Gross National Income (GNI) in Purchasing Power Parity (PPP) US dollars.

Trends by UNDP reports 
Human Development Index (by UN Method) of Indian states since 1990 (2019 revision).

Trend analysis by Indian National Development Reports 
Compared with the previous Indian National Human Development Reports and the latest state-level government statistical report, India has significantly improved its HDI in all of its administrative subdivisions:

 This is a list of Indian states by their respective Human Development Index (HDI), as of 2008. Kerala stands first in Human Development Index among the states in India.

Consumption-based HDI 
There are many ways to calculate HDI, and its calculation is sensitive to base data and assumptions. Using another approach, UNDP India and Government of India calculated the HDI nationwide average to be 0.605 in 2006. This data was published by the Indian Government. Note that the 2007-2008 HDI values in the table below is not based on income as is the UNDP standard practice for global comparisons, but on estimated consumption expenditure – an assumption which underestimates the HDI compared to the actual value. Further, data was unavailable for the following union territories: Chandigarh, Lakshadweep, Andaman and Nicobar Islands, Daman and Diu, Puducherry, and Dadra and Nagar Haveli.

References 

Human Development Index
Human Development Index
Human Development Index
India, HDI